XIII Minutes, also known as Thirteen Minutes, is an American groove metal and metalcore band that was formed in late 2015 out of Tulsa, Oklahoma. The band is signed to Rottweiler Records.

History 
XIII Minutes began in late 2015, originating out of Tulsa, Oklahoma. At the time, Jamie Kucinski and Aaron Smith were in another band. The other band lost their vocalist, which led to the two searching for a new vocalist. The two found Michael Rowley. The band quickly shifted into Thirteen Minutes, with the three also adding rhythm guitarist Horace Young and bassist John Walker. The band worked on material for a long period of time, eventually signing with Rottweiler Records. In an agreement between Rottweiler and the band, they decided to release material in the form of two song releases titled digital 45s. With the agreement in place, the band debuted with the release of their first D45, Sibling Rivalry. The D45 was followed up by the releases of Macharia, Obsessed, and Water Vice. On April 5, 2019, the band released their album, Obsessed, which had become a long-awaited release. The album was very well received, receiving high reviews. In 2020, the band announced they would be taking a brief hiatus, as lead guitarist Aaron Smith departed the band due to undisclosed reasons.

On March 5, 2021, co-founder and drummer Jamie Kucinski announced the band was on indefinite hiatus.  In early 2022, XIII Minutes announced their return and were auditioning vocalists finally announcing Jordan Harvey as their new vocalist in June 2022.

Members 
Current
Jordan Harvey – lead vocals, guitar
Jamie Kucinski – drums (2015–present)
Thomas Wheat – bass (2019–2020), guitar and backing vocals (2022–present)

Former
Horace Young – rhythm guitar (2016–2017)
John Walker – bass (2017–2018)
Michael Rowley – vocals (2016–2020)
Aaron Smith – lead guitar (2015–2020)

Timeline

Discography 
Studio albums
Obsessed (2019)

D45s
Sibling Rivalry (2017)
Macharia (2017)
Obsessed (2017)
Water Vice (2018)

Singles
Obsessed (Death Therapy Remix) featuring Jason Wisdom (2022)

References 

Metalcore musical groups from Oklahoma
American groove metal musical groups
American Christian metal musical groups
Rottweiler Records artists
Musical groups established in 2016
2016 establishments in Oklahoma